Brandon Lee (born May 16, 1979), is a Filipino-American gay pornographic film actor. He is regarded as the first gay Asian porn star and arguably the most popular Asian pornographic actor in contemporary gay male culture.

Pornography career

Lee started in the industry in 1997 at age 18 after being discovered by adult film director Chi Chi Larue at a bathhouse. He chose the name of actor Brandon Lee as his porn name. His first movies were under Catalina Video for the Asian niche market but he crossed over into the mainstream gay pornography by 1998.  He worked as a top which was unusual at that time for an Asian actor in US or European gay pornography.

An analysis of Lee's work, and his place in the gay pornography industry, written by Nguyen Tan Hoang, appeared in the book Porn Studies (Linda Williams, Duke University Press). According to Richard Fung, Asian men were usually portrayed asexually in Western culture, and Nguyen argued that Lee's position in gay pornography challenged these stereotypes. The essay is entitled "The Resurrection of Brandon Lee: The Making of a Gay Asian-American Porn Star."

He was also awarded the "Wall of Fame" award at the 2015 Grabby Awards in Chicago, IL.

See also

List of male performers in gay porn films

References

External links
 
 
 The Myth That Is : An Interview with Brandon Lee

1979 births
American actors in gay pornographic films
American male pornographic film actors
American pornographic film actors of Filipino descent
Living people
American LGBT people of Asian descent
21st-century LGBT people